Fourmile Creek is a tributary of the Arkansas River in Chaffee County, Colorado.  The confluence with the Arkansas River is at  just north of Buena Vista, Colorado.

See also
List of rivers of Colorado

References
 Friends of Fourmile organization
 Map

Rivers of Colorado
Rivers of Chaffee County, Colorado